The Islamic Front for Armed Jihad (French name, Front Islamique du Djihad Armé, hence the abbreviation FIDA) was a militant Islamist organization active during the Algerian Civil War. It called for the violent overthrow of the secular Algerian government, and a system of government based on shari'a law.

On July 21, 1996, it merged under the auspices of Mustapha Kartali with the Movement for an Islamic State (MEI) and splinter factions of the Groupe Islamique Armée (GIA) to form the Islamic Movement for Preaching and Jihad (MIPD).
Factions of the Algerian Civil War
Jihadist groups in Algeria